Le Lido is a musical theatre venue located on the Champs-Élysées in Paris, France. It opened in 1946 at 78 Avenue des Champs-Élysées and moved to its current location in 1977. Until its purchase by Accor in 2021, it was known for its exotic cabaret and burlesque shows including dancers, singers, and other performers. Famous names have performed there including: Edith Piaf, Siegfried and Roy, Hervé Vilard, Sylvie Vartan, Ray Vasquez, Renee Victor, Johnny Hallyday, Maurice Chevalier, Marlene Dietrich, Eartha Kitt, Josephine Baker, Kessler Twins, Elton John, Laurel & Hardy, Dalida, Shirley MacLaine, Mitzi Gaynor, Juliet Prowse, and Noël Coward.

History 
Founded by Joseph and Louis Clérico, Le Lido opened on June 20, 1946. Le Lido was preceded by an artificial beach in a townhouse basement in the 1920s, running as a nightclub/casino in the late night hours.

In 1955, after a visit by the entertainment director of the Stardust Resort and Casino, Las Vegas, the Clérico brothers along with Donn Arden brought the Lido to the Stardust Las Vegas. This started a series of imports of Parisian cabaret shows to Las Vegas: Folies Bergère to the Tropicana, Nouvelle Eve to Hotel El Rancho Vegas and Casino de Paris to the Dunes. The Stardust edition of Le Lido closed in 1992.

Le Lido moved in 1977 to the Normandie on the Champs-Élysées.

In 2006, Sodexo, the international food service company, purchased Le Lido and invested 24 million euro into developing its show.

The hotel group Accor bought Le Lido in 2021 and dismissed most of the permanent employees, mainly artists and technicians, in order to replace the costly dinner shows and revues with less expensive musical theatre productions.

Cabaret shows 
The Lido was closed from December 2, 2014, to April 2, 2015, while a new version of the show was prepared. The new version was developed by Franco Dragone. Each version of Le Lido was made up of 10–20 scenes and ran for about an hour and a half. Two shows were run every day of the week. A pre-show dinner, featuring a robotic orchestra, was offered with the first evening show of each day at an additional cost.

In spring 2015, Franco Dragone created a new show for Le Lido titled Paris Merveilles.

Each Le Lido show featured singers and dancers, which always included the famous Bluebell Girls. A few featured dancers, showgirls and lead singers were sometimes added. The Lido was known for its spectacular costumes featuring thousands of dollars in feathers and rhinestones, rich fabrics, and top quality furs.

The opening or "theme" scene welcomed the audience and set the tone for the evening. It also sometimes set the colour scheme for the show and featured special effects and lighting. Music could be original or a medley of current popular songs mixed with music from Broadway or Hollywood films; often the opening number was a potpourri of styles and performers could change costumes several times. Between the production numbers, specialty "vaudeville/cabaret" acts were featured, such as jugglers, acrobats or magicians. At least one scene would feature water effects – another thing the Lido was known for. The stage itself could be raised and lowered, change back and forth into an ice rink or swimming pool, and feature elaborate set pieces which came up from below. The closing number often featured a number called "Merci Beaucoup" (featured in the television show Shirley Maclaine at The Lido de Paris) and usually had some particularly spectacular costumes.

Among the last of its kind, the Lido had a special place in the history of nightclubs and floorshows and continued a tradition of the "naughty but nice" opulent production shows originally started by the Folies Bergère.

Bluebell Girls

Founded by Margaret Kelly, also known as Miss Bluebell, the dancers of the Lido were known as the Bluebell Girls. Until her retirement in 1986, each dancer was selected by Kelly. The dancers were afterwards under the direction of Pierre Rambert until his retirement in December 2014. According to Forbes, they were "some of the world’s most beautiful and talented burlesque dancers". The cast came from all over the world, and were noted for their statuesque height, averaging 5' 11".

Production history
Every few years, Le Lido developed a new version of its show. The show used to change more frequently, but in later times each iteration could run for several years until the management felt it had run its course and a new production was called for. Each show could take millions of dollars to develop. The following are the titles of each show produced by the Le Lido:
1946 – Sans Rimes Ni Raisons
1946 – Mississippi
1947 – Made in Paris
1948 – Confetti
1949 – Bravo
1950 – Enchantment
1951 – Rendez-vous
1953 – Voilà
1954 – Desirs
1955 – Voulez-vous
1956 – C'est Magnifique
1957 – Prestige
1959 – Avec Plaisir
1961 – Pour Vous
1962 – Suivez-Moi
1964 – Quelle Nuit
1966 – Pourquoi Pas?
1969 – Grand Prix
1971 – Bonjour La Nuit
1972 – Grand Jeu
1977 – Allez Lido
1981 – Cocorico
1985 – Panache
1990 – Bravissimo
1994 – C'est Magique
2003 – Bonheur (closed December 2, 2014)
2015 – Paris Merveilles (Paris Wonders)

Media featuring Le Lido
Shirley Maclaine at the Lido (1979) produced by Gary Smith and Dwight Hemion – Nominated for a Primetime Emmy for Outstanding Comedy-Variety or Music Program.

Few scenes from the music video named Samajavaragamana of the feature film soundtrack of 2020 Indian Tollywood (Telugu) film Ala Vaikunthapurramuloo featuring Allu Arjun, Pooja Hegde was made a shot in Lido De Paris 

The Bluebell Girls were featured in a 1960 episode of Close-Up, a Canadian TV show broadcast on the CBC

Numerous clips of several of the shows of the last 20 years and even full videos of all the production numbers from some editions are available on YouTube.

See also

Venues:
 Casino de Paris
 Folies Bergère
 Minsky's Burlesque
 Moulin Rouge
 Paradis Latin
 Tropicana Club
Theatre groups:
 Cabaret Red Light
Shows:
 Absinthe – a Las Vegas show
 Jubilee! – a revue show in Las Vegas
 Peepshow – a burlesque show in Nevada
 Sirens of TI – a Las Vegas casino show

Notes

External links

 Lido Official website

Cabarets in Paris
Buildings and structures in the 8th arrondissement of Paris
1946 establishments in France
Burlesque theatres